Frederick Wilfrid ("Wilf") Lancaster (September 4, 1933 – August 25, 2013) was a British-American information scientist. He immigrated to the USA in 1959 and worked as information specialist for the National Library of Medicine in Bethesda, Maryland from 1965–68. He was a professor at the University of Illinois, Urbana from 1972-92 and professor emeritus from 1992-2013. He continued as an honored scholar after retirement speaking on the evolution of librarianship in the 20th and 21st century. Lancaster made notable achievements with early online retrieval systems, including evaluation studies of MEDLARS.  He published broadly in Library and Information Science over a period of four decades and continuously emerged as a visionary leader in the field, where research, writing, and teaching earned him the highest honors in the profession. Lancaster excelled at many fronts: as scholar, educator, mentor, and writer.

Awards
 Best  JASIST Paper (1969) for "MEDLARS: Report on Evaluation of its Operating Efficiency"
 ASIS&T Award of Merit (1988)
 Best Information Science Book of the Year (1992) for Indexing and Abstracting in Theory and Practice

See also
Document classification
Information science
Information scientist
Information society
Paperless society

List of works
Baker, S. L. & Lancaster, F. W. (1977/1991). The Measurement and Evaluation of Library Services. 2nd  ed.  Arlington, Va.: Information Resources Press.  (1st ed. 1977; 2nd ed. 1991).  
Lancaster, F. W. (1968a). Evaluation of the MEDLARS demand search service. [Washington] U.S. Dept. of Health, Education, and Welfare, Public Health Service.
Lancaster, F. W. (1968b). Information retrieval systems; characteristics, testing, and evaluation. New York, Wiley. 
Lancaster, F. W. (1978).  Toward Paperless Information Systems. New York: Academic Press. 
Lancaster, F. W. (1982).  Libraries and Librarians in an Age of Electronics. Arlington, Va.:  Information Resources Press. 
Lancaster, F. W. (1985). Thesaurus  construction  and use; a condensed course. Paris: General Information Programme and Unisist, Unesco.     
Lancaster, F. W. (1986). Vocabulary control for information retrieval. 2nd. ed. Arlington, Va.: Information Resources Press.    
Lancaster, F. W. (1988/1993).  If You Want to Evaluate Your Library. Champaign: University of Illinois, Graduate School of Library and Information Science. (1st ed. 1988, 2nd ed. 1993). 
Lancaster, F. W. (1991/1998/2003). Indexing and abstracting in theory and practice. London: Library Association.  (1st ed. 1991; 2nd ed. 1998; 3rd. ed. 2003).  
Lancaster, F. W. (Ed.). (1993). Libraries  and  the  future;  essays on the library in the twenty-first century. New York : Haworth Press.  
Lancaster, F. W. & Fayen, E. G. (1973).  Information Retrieval On-Line. Los Angeles: Melville Pub. Co.
Lancaster, F. W. & Sandore, B. (1997). Technology and the Management of Library and Information Services. Champaign: University of Illinois, Graduate School of Library and Information Science.
Lancaster, F. W. & Smith, L. C. (1983). Compatibility  issues  affecting  information  systems  and  services. Prepared for the General Information Programme and UNISIST. Paris: United Nations Educational, Scientific and Cultural Organization. 
Martyn, J. & Lancaster, F. W. (1981). Investigative methods in library and information science; an introduction. Arlington, Va.: Information Resources Press.

Notes

References
 Festschrift: Haricombe, Lorraine J. &  Russell, Keith (eds). (2008). The Influence of F. W. Lancaster on Information Science and on Libraries. Library Trends, 56(4). 

1933 births
2013 deaths
Information scientists
American librarians
British emigrants to the United States
British librarians
University of Illinois Urbana-Champaign faculty